The 1979 Chicago Marathon was the 3rd running of the annual marathon race in Chicago, United States and was held on October 21. The elite men's and women's races were won by Americans Dan Cloeter (2:23:20 hours) and Laura Michalek (3:15:45). A total of 2869 runners finished the race, a drop of nearly 1200 from the previous year.

Results

Men

Women

References

Results. Association of Road Racing Statisticians. Retrieved 2020-05-26.
Chicago Marathon Year-By-Year. Chicago Marathon. Retrieved 2020-05-26.

External links 
 Official website

1979
Chicago
1970s in Chicago
1979 in Illinois
Chicago Marathon
Chicago Marathon